Margarites glabrus is a species of sea snail, a marine gastropod mollusk in the family Margaritidae.

Description
The height of the shell attains  5 mm.

Distribution
This species occurs in the arctic waters of the Pacific Ocean.

Habitat
This species is found in the following habitats:
 brackish
 marine

References

External links
 To World Register of Marine Species

glabrus
Gastropods described in 1978